Marcus Aurelius Scaurus (died 105 BC) was a Roman politician and general during the Cimbrian War. After one of the consul designates was prosecuted and condemned, Scaurus was made consul suffectus in 108 BC.

In 105 BC he went as a senior legate with the consul Gnaeus Mallius Maximus to Gaul to battle the Cimbric invasion. Scaurus was ordered to construct a cavalry camp around 30 miles north of the consular camp. The Battle of Arausio began with the Cimbri and Teutones advancing on the cavalry camp, which provided little resistance. The Roman force was completely overwhelmed and the legate was captured and brought before the Cimbrian leader Boiorix. Scaurus was not humbled by his capture and advised Boiorix to turn back before his people were destroyed by the Roman forces. The king of the Cimbri was indignant at this impudence and had Scaurus executed. According to Granius Licinianus, he could have escaped death but chose not to; in addition, he refused their request to help lead their forces, considering it shameful to outlive his defeated army.

References

 Additional brief references to Scaurus' death at the hands of the Cimbri can be found in Orosius 5.16; Tacitus, Germania 37; pseudo-Quintilian, Declamationes Maiores 3.13; Velleius Paterculus, Historiae Romanae 2.12.

Year of birth unknown
105 BC deaths
2nd-century BC Roman consuls
Senators of the Roman Republic
Ancient Roman generals
Executed ancient Roman people
Scaurus, Marcus